Arthur E. Toby (1903–1984) was a rugby union player who represented Australia and a professional rugby league footballer in the NSWRFL.

Rugby career

Toby, an auburn headed centre, was born in Sydney in 1903. He learnt his football as a youth with the Y.M.C.A junior rugby union sides and rose with that club to first grade. He later and claimed a total of 3 international rugby caps for Australia against New Zealand between 1924 and 1925.

Rugby league career

In 1926 he changed codes to Rugby League where he was a very popular clubman. He played 4 seasons with Sydney Roosters between 1926 and 1929, and finished his career at Balmain Tigers, playing three seasons between 1931 and 1933. He captained Balmain in 1931.
He was the fullback in Easts 26–5 loss to South Sydney in the 1928 Final.

References

1903 births
1984 deaths
Australian rugby league players
Australian rugby union players
Australia international rugby union players
Year of birth uncertain
Sydney Roosters players
Sydney Roosters captains
Balmain Tigers players
Rugby league players from Sydney
Rugby union centres
Rugby union players from Sydney